Seynaeve is a surname. Notable people with the surname include:

Lander Seynaeve (born 1992), Belgian cyclist
Marcel Seynaeve (1933–2015), Belgian cyclist
Maurice Seynaeve (1907–1998), Belgian cyclist